Riversdale is a town located on the N2 highway between Cape Town and George on the Agulhas Coastal Plain of the southern Western Cape province of South Africa.  It is an agricultural service oriented town, being a hub for shopping and other services for surrounding farming communities, smaller towns, and coastal resorts, like Witsand and Stilbaai.  It is located beneath the imposing Langeberg Mountains to the north, with Sleeping Beauty Mountain overlooking the town.

History
The town was founded as a church on the farm, Doornkraal, and was subsequently named after Harry Rivers, the then incumbent Civil Commissioner of Swellendam.  It was proclaimed a town on 30 August 1838.  Riverdale is the seat of the Hessequa Local Municipality.  It is also sometimes considered the westernmost point in the Garden Route region.

Notable residents 
Willem Botha, singer
 Dyan Buis, Paralympic athlete
Dalene Matthee (13 October 1938 – 20 February 2005), writer who matriculated here at Hoërskool Langenhoven
 Dr Cecil Moss, Springbok rugby player and coach
 Jack Simons, academic and anti-apartheid activist
 Jan Ernst Abraham Volschenk (20 August 1853 Riversdale – 22 January 1936 Riversdale), painter noted for his majestic landscapes of the Langeberg Range in the Western Cape Province
 Vera Volschenk (1899-1987), painter born in 1899; eldest of nine daughters of Jan Ernst Abraham Volschenk

See also
 South African Class 7E 4-8-0
 South African Class 7F 4-8-0

References

Populated places in the Hessequa Local Municipality
Populated places established in 1838
1838 establishments in the Cape Colony